Chitor Rani Padmini is a 1963 Indian Tamil-language historical drama film written by C. V. Sridhar and Elangovan, and directed by Ch. Narayana Murthy. It is based on the legend of Rani Padmini. The film starred Sivaji Ganesan as Rana Ratan Singh and Vyjayanthimala as the title character. M. N. Nambiar, T. S. Balaiah, Kaka Radhakrishnan, and T. P. Muthulakshmi appear in supporting roles. It was released on 9 February 1963.

Plot

Cast 

 Vyjayanthimala as Rani Padmini
 Sivaji Ganesan as Rana Ratan Singh|Bheem Singh
 T. S. Balaiah as Alauddin Khalji
 M. N. Nambiar as Malik Kafur
 D. Balasubramaniam
 Kaka Radhakrishnan
 T. K. Sampangi
 Kannan
 Kumar
 Pulimmootai Ramasami
 Rushyendramani
 T. P. Muthulakshmi
 Vijaya
 Ragini
 Helen

Production 
Production began in 1957–58, but progressed slowly for years due to financial troubles.

Soundtrack 
The music was composed by G. Ramanathan while the lyrics were penned by Udumalai Narayana Kavi, Surabhi, Ku. Ma. Balasubramaniam, Thanjai N. Ramaiah Dass, Kannadasan and A. Maruthakasi.

Release and reception 
Chitor Rani Padmini was released on 9 February 1963, delayed from November 1961. The magazine Kumudam faulted it for "despicable distortion", while another magazine, Kalki lamented that Padmini, an icon of chastity, had been turned into a dancing queen. Viewers, however, praised Vyjayanthimala's dancing, despite the fact that the real Padmini was not known to be a dancer. The film was commercially unsuccessful.

References

External links 
 

1960s historical films
1960s Tamil-language films
1963 films
Cultural depictions of Rani Padmini
Films directed by Chitrapu Narayana Rao
Films scored by G. Ramanathan
Films set in ancient India
Films set in Rajasthan
Films set in the Rajput Empire
Films with screenplays by C. V. Sridhar
History of India on film
Indian black-and-white films
Indian historical films